Charles, Duke of Södermanland may refer to:

 Duke Charles, then king Charles IX of Sweden
 Charles Philip, Duke of Södermanland, brother of Gustav II Adolf
 Duke Charles, then king Charles XIII of Sweden
 Duke Charles Oscar, son of Charles XV of Sweden